John Brennan Crutchley (October 1, 1946 – March 30, 2002) was an American convicted kidnapper, rapist, and suspected serial killer who was suspected of murdering up to 30 women, but was never tried for nor convicted of murder. He was called the "Vampire Rapist" because he drained the blood of his victim almost to the point of death while he repeatedly raped her.

Early life and career
Born to a well-to-do family in Clarksburg, West Virginia, John Crutchley was a friendless child, preferring to spend most of his time tinkering with electronic gadgets in the basement of his home. This penchant for electronics paid off early when he earned a good amount of money repairing and rebuilding complex radio and stereo systems even before he graduated from high school. Eventually, he graduated with a bachelor's degree in physics from Defiance College in Ohio in 1970, and earned a master's degree in engineering administration at George Washington University in Washington, D.C. He married his first wife in 1969.

Crutchley's first marriage showed strains by the time he graduated from college, and it had all but ended by the time he moved to Kokomo, Indiana, to work at Delco Electronics Corporation. Crutchley had been working at General Motors' Central Foundry Division in Defiance, Ohio, where he was responsible for the installation of a new plant security system. He applied for a transfer to Delco Electronics in Kokomo, where the systems were designed and built, and worked there for several years as an electrical systems engineer. 

His departure from Kokomo came after an investigation was made by plant security into missing materials. He later moved to Fairfax County, Virginia, in the mid-1970s and remarried. He worked for several high-tech firms in the Washington, D.C. area, including TRW, ICA and Logicon Process Systems. At about this time, several teenaged girls disappeared in and around that area.  He later moved to Florida and began working in 1983 at Harris Corporation in Palm Bay, Florida.

Disappearances
In 1977, a 25-year-old Fairfax, Virginia secretary, Debbora Fitzjohn, disappeared. Crutchley was placed under close scrutiny because he was Fitzjohn's boyfriend and she was last seen alive at the trailer park where Crutchley lived. As a result, he was questioned several times for his possible involvement in her disappearance. However, nothing came of it due to lack of evidence, even after her skeletal remains were found by a hunter in October the following year.

The "Vampire Rapist"
According to FBI profiler Robert K. Ressler, Crutchley fit the profile of a serial killer, even though he was convicted of only a single non-fatal kidnapping and sexual assault.

In late November 1985, in Malabar, Brevard County, Florida, a nude teenaged girl, handcuffed at both feet and ankles, was found crawling along the side of the road. She had been passed by several trucks before someone stopped to help her. She begged the driver to not take her back "to that house,"; when he asked where, she told him to remember a certain house. He noted the location, took her home, and called for police and an ambulance.

The hospital determined she was missing between 40 and 45 percent of her blood and had ligature marks on her neck. She had been hitchhiking the day before and the man who gave her a ride was willing to take her where she needed to go, but said he had to stop off at home first. He invited her in and she refused, and he got into the back seat of the car and choked her unconscious.

A search warrant was served for John Brennan Crutchley, whose wife and child were away for the Thanksgiving holiday. The videotape in the camera was partially erased, which according to the victim would otherwise have contained footage of her rape and the extraction of her blood. Crutchley was arrested during the search, which took place at 2:30 a.m. Photographs of the house taken at the time of this first search showed, among other things, a stack of credit cards several inches thick. A second, later, search did not turn up these credit cards, nor a collection of women's necklaces concealed in a closet which had been noted, but not confiscated, by the police during the first search.

After being contacted by local authorities for his input, Ressler was convinced that Crutchley had almost certainly killed before, identified him as a "serial killer of the organized type". Ressler instigated a second search, which was of much wider scope and detail than the first. Ressler noted that there had been four female bodies found in Brevard County in the previous year, and that unexplained bodies had been found and missing women reported in Pennsylvania while he lived there. No evidence was found to link these deaths to Crutchley, however.

In addition to suspecting Crutchley of murders in Florida and Pennsylvania, Ressler also suspected Crutchley for murder in the 1977 disappearance of Debbora Fitzjohn, the secretary whom he met in Fairfax, Virginia.  She had been in his mobile home and police identified Crutchley as the last person to see her alive.

What was found during the second search in the Brevard County teen case included a stack of 72 3x5 cards on which Crutchley had recorded women's names and described their sexual performances. When contacted, some of the partners indicated that Crutchley had crossed the line from "kinky" consensual acts into sexual assaults involving restraint. His wife had apparently cooperated in similar acts, and spoke to the press about him. Among other remarks, she commented on his attack on the handcuffed teen — which took place while she was away with their own daughter for Thanksgiving — calling it "a gentle rape, devoid of any overt brutality."

In June 1986, Crutchley pleaded guilty on kidnapping and rape charges in exchange for prosecutors dropping the "grievous bodily harm" charge for extracting the victim's blood and for drug possession. During the sentencing phase, the blood issue came up nonetheless and Crutchley claimed to have been introduced to blood drinking by a nurse in roughly 1970 as part of a sexual ritual. He said it should not be considered in his sentencing because in this case, he had not drunk the blood; he claimed that it had coagulated before he could drink it, "and he couldn't get it down". His wife did not take the stand, but told reporters that her husband wasn't guilty, but was just "a kinky sort of guy."

Based on testimony from Ressler at the sentencing hearing, the judge chose to exceed state guidelines and sentenced Crutchley to 25 years to life in prison with 50 years of subsequent parole.

Release and re-arrest
Writing in 1992 about the 1986 conviction, Ressler predicted that Crutchley's "25 to life" sentence would result in release as soon as 1998. In fact, Crutchley was released two years earlier than that.

After serving 11 years of his sentence, Crutchley was released on August 8, 1996, from Union Correctional Institution in Raiford, Florida for the Brevard County Jail for good behavior. Officials in Bridgeport, West Virginia, where his mother lived, did not want him, nor did the people in Malabar and Melbourne. Therefore, he was transferred to the Orlando Probation and Restitution Center, a half-way house where he would undergo counseling and pay restitution even while serving his 50 years of parole.

Less than a day later, he was arrested again for violating his parole after testing positive for marijuana. Even though he denied smoking marijuana (saying that inmates blew marijuana smoke in his face), prosecutors in the subsequent trial showed Crutchley confessing to a corrections inspector that he smoked the substance because he was nervous about his impending release and he was aware of the relaxing effects of cannabis. This violation of his parole resulted in a sentence of life imprisonment to be imposed on Crutchley on January 31, 1997, under the "three strikes law". This was his third conviction; the first two were for the kidnapping and the rape of the Brevard teen.

Death
On March 30, 2002, Crutchley died in prison. Corrections officials reported on April 2, 2002, that he had been found dead in his cell at the Hardee Correctional Institute with a plastic bag over his head. The cause of death reported was asphyxiation. Subsequent reporting around August 1, 2003, from the Florida Department of Corrections declared that Crutchley died of autoerotic asphyxiation.

Classified information
At the time of his arrest, Crutchley was found to be in possession of a great deal of highly classified information regarding naval weaponry and communications. Unnamed federal agencies other than the FBI considered opening an espionage case against him. Crutchley's employer, Harris Corporation, was highly involved with not only the NASA research and launch facilities at Cape Canaveral, but also with other Naval contractors and subcontractors.

Media coverage
On October 30, 2010, the cable channel Investigation Discovery broadcast a 20-minute summary of the Brevard County incident which led to Crutchley's incarceration. This episode of American Occult includes interviews with "vampirism sociologist" Katherine Ramsland, as well as law enforcement officers from Brevard County, Florida, Robert Leatherow and Jake Miller, and also identifies the victim as one Laura Murphy.

This episode also includes archival video imaging of Crutchley, including his declaration that the attribution of vampirism is pointless, declaring that "it's all about the label of the 'big V', the 'big V' is empty, that's not me". Several archival photographs included in this program show the young Mr. Crutchley looking very typical of the times and places of his youth. Professor Ramsland notes of Mr. Crutchley that there was nothing at all about him which would send danger signals to potential victims, indeed, she states that there was "nothing about him that would indicate he was anything but an engineer".

References

1946 births
2002 deaths
American electronics engineers
American kidnappers
American people who died in prison custody
American prisoners sentenced to life imprisonment
American rapists
People from West Virginia
Prisoners sentenced to life imprisonment by Florida
Prisoners who died in Florida detention
Vampirism (crime)
Suspected serial killers